Mahdi Hassan Fahs (born 13 October 1994) is a Lebanese footballer who plays as a forward for  club Sagesse, on loan from Ahed.

Club career 
Fahs began his senior debut at Lebanese Premier League side Ahed aged 18, during the 2012–13 season. In his first season at the club, Fahs played six league games, scoring one goal in the process. Fahs won his first title with Ahed during the 2013–14 season, helping his side life the 2013 Lebanese Elite Cup. The following season, in 2014–15, Fahs won his first league title, scoring two league goals in 16 games.

Fahs continued to help Ahed win domestically, lifting both the 2015 Lebanese Elite Cup, and the 2015 Lebanese Super Cup. During the 2015–16 season, Fahs scored two goals in 11 league games. In 2016–17, Fahs won his second league title with his club, playing 18 games in the league. Due to his performances that season, Fahs was included in the 2016–17 Lebanese Premier League Team of the Season.

In 2017–18 Ahed won three competitions: a league title, a Lebanese FA Cup, and a Lebanese Super Cup. During the 2017–18 season, Fahs played 16 league games, and helped Ahed win both a league title and a Super Cup. At the start of the 2018–19 season, he sustained a cruciate ligament injury, remaining unavailable for seven months. Fahs finished the season with two league games, and won both the league and FA Cup. 

In August 2019, he was injured in his other foot's cruciate ligament, for six months. On 26 March 2021, midway through the 2020–21 season, Fahs sustained his third ACL injury, during a friendly game against Shabab Bourj. He returned to training in September 2022.

In December 2022, Fahs joined Sagesse ahead of the second half of the 2022–23 Lebanese Premier League.

International career 
Fahs made his international senior debut for Lebanon on 9 October 2014, in a friendly against Qatar; Lebanon lost the encounter 5–0.

Honours 
Ahed
 AFC Cup: 2019
 Lebanese Premier League: 2014–15, 2016–17, 2017–18, 2018–19, 2021–22
 Lebanese FA Cup: 2017–18, 2018–19
 Lebanese Elite Cup: 2013, 2015; runner-up: 2021
 Lebanese Super Cup: 2015, 2017, 2018, 2019

Individual
 Lebanese Premier League Team of the Season: 2016–17

References

External links

 
 
 
 
 

1994 births
Living people
People from Nabatieh
Lebanese footballers
Association football forwards
Al Ahed FC players
Sagesse SC footballers
Lebanese Premier League players
Lebanon youth international footballers
Lebanon international footballers